During the 1950s and 1960s the Soviet space program used dogs for sub-orbital and orbital space flights to determine whether human spaceflight was feasible. In this period, the Soviet Union launched missions with passenger slots for at least 57 dogs. The number of dogs in space is smaller, as some dogs flew more than once. Most survived; the few that died were lost mostly through technical failures, according to the parameters of the test. A notable exception is Laika, the first animal to be sent into orbit, whose death during the 3 November 1957 Sputnik 2 mission was expected from its outset.

Training
Dogs were the preferred animal for the experiments because scientists felt dogs were well suited to endure long periods of inactivity. As part of their training, they were confined in small boxes for 15–20 days at a time. Stray dogs, rather than animals accustomed to living in a house, were chosen because the scientists felt they would be able to tolerate the rigorous and extreme stresses of space flight better than other dogs. Female dogs were used because of their temperament and because the suit the dogs wore in order to collect urine and feces was equipped with a special device, designed to work only with females.

Their training included standing still for long periods of time, wearing space suits, being placed in simulators that acted like a rocket during launch, riding in centrifuges that simulated the high acceleration of a rocket launch and being kept in progressively smaller cages to prepare them for the confines of the space module. Dogs that flew in orbit were fed a nutritious jelly-like protein. This was high in fiber and assisted the dogs to defecate during long periods of time while in their small space module. More than 60% of dogs to enter space were reportedly suffering from constipation and gallstones on arrival back to base.

Sub-orbital flights

The dogs wore pressure suits with acrylic glass bubble helmets. In the R-2 and R-5 rockets, the dogs were contained in a pressured cabin.

Dezik, Tsygan, and Lisa-1
Dezik (Дезик) and Tsygan (Цыган, "Gypsy") were the first dogs to make a sub-orbital flight on 15 August 1951. Dezik made another sub-orbital flight in 1951 with the first dog named Lisa (Лиса, "Fox"), although neither survived because the parachute failed to deploy. After the death of Dezik, Tsygan was adopted as a pet by Soviet physicist Anatoli Blagonravov.

Lisa-2 and Ryzhik

Smelaya and Malyshka
Smelaya (Смелая, "Brave" or "Courageous", fem.) was due to make a flight in September but ran away the day before the launch. She was found the next day and went on to make a successful flight with a dog named Malyshka (Малышка, "Baby"). They both crashed after the rocket failed to deploy a parachute, and were found the next day by the recovery team.

Bobik and ZIB
Bobik (Бобик, common Russian name for a small dog) ran away just days before his flight was scheduled to take place on 15 September 1951. A replacement named ZIB (ЗИБ, a Russian acronym for "Substitute for Missing Bobik", "Замена Исчезнувшему Бобику" Zamena Ischeznuvshemu Bobiku), who was an untrained street dog found running around the barracks, was quickly located and made a successful flight to 100 km and back.

Otvazhnaya and Snezhinka
Otvazhnaya (Отважная, "brave one", fem.) made a flight on 2 July 1959 along with a rabbit named Marfusha (Марфуша, "little Martha") and another dog named Snezhinka (Снежинка, "Snowflake"). She went on to make 5 other flights between 1959 and 1960.

Albina and Tsyganka
Albina was one of the dogs shortlisted for Sputnik 2, but never flew in orbit.

Damka and Krasavka
Damka (Дамка, "queen of checkers") and Krasavka (Красавка, "little beauty" or "Belladonna") were to make an orbital flight on 22 December 1960 as a part of the Vostok programme which also included mice. However their mission was marked by a string of equipment failures.

In the event of unscheduled return to the surface, the craft was to eject the dogs and self-destruct, but the ejection seat failed and the primary destruct mechanism shorted out. The animals were thus still in the intact capsule when it returned to the surface. The backup self-destruct mechanism was set to a 60-hour timer, so a team was quickly sent out to locate and recover the capsule.

Although the capsule was reached in deep snow on the first day, there was insufficient remaining daylight to disarm the self-destruct mechanism and open the capsule.  The team could only report that the window was frosted over in the  degree temperatures and no signs of life were detected.  On the second day, however, the dogs were heard barking as the capsule was opened.  The dogs were wrapped in sheepskin coats and flown to Moscow alive, though all the mice aboard the capsule were found dead because of the cold.

Damka was also known as Shutka (Шутка, "Joke") or Zhemchuzhnaya (Жемчужная, "Pearly") and Krasavka was also known as Kometka (Кометка, "Little Comet") or Zhulka (Жулька, "Cheater"). After this incident Krasavka was adopted by Oleg Gazenko, a leading Soviet scientist working with animals used in space flights. She went on to have puppies and continued living with Gazenko and his family until her death 14 years later.
After the incident Sergey Korolyov, who was the designer of the rocket, wanted to make the story public, but was prevented from doing so by state censorship.

Bars and Lisichka
Bars (Барс (pron. "Barss"); "snow leopard") and Lisichka (Лисичка, "little fox") were also on a mission to orbit as a part of the Vostok programme, but died after their rocket exploded 28.5 seconds into the launch on 28 July 1960. Bars was also known as Chayka (Чайка, "seagull").

Other dogs that flew on sub-orbital flights include Dymka (Дымка, "smoky"), Modnitsa (Модница, "fashionista") and Kozyavka (Козявка, "booger").

At least four other dogs flew in September 1951, and two or more were lost.

Orbital flights

Laika

On 3 November 1957 Laika (Лайка, "barker") flew to space on Sputnik 2 to become the first Earth-born creature (other than microbes) to orbit the planet. Many sub-orbital flights with animal passengers had already been to space, such as the 1949 mission of the rhesus macaque Albert II. Laika was also known as Zhuchka (Жучка, "Little Bug") and Limonchik (Лимончик, "Little Lemon"). The American media dubbed her "Muttnik", making a play-on-words for the canine follow-on to the first orbital mission, Sputnik. She died between five and seven hours into the flight from stress and overheating.

Laika's true cause of death was not made public until October 2002; officials previously gave reports that she died when the oxygen supply ran out. At a Moscow press conference in 1998 Oleg Gazenko, a senior Soviet scientist involved in the project, stated "The more time passes, the more I'm sorry about it. We did not learn enough from the mission to justify the death of the dog...".

Belka and Strelka

Belka (Белка, literally, "squirrel", or alternatively "Whitey") and Strelka (Стрелка, "little arrow") spent a day in space aboard Korabl-Sputnik 2 (Sputnik 5) on 19 August 1960 before safely returning to Earth. They are the first higher living organisms to survive orbit in outer space.

They were accompanied by a grey rabbit, 42 mice, two rats, flies and several plants and fungi. All passengers survived. They were the first Earth-born creatures to go into orbit and return alive, and gave birth to many descendants.

Pchyolka and Mushka

Pchyolka (Пчёлка, "little bee") and Mushka (Мушка, "little fly") spent a day in orbit on 1 December 1960 on board Korabl-Sputnik-3 (Sputnik 6) with "other animals", plants and insects. Due to a reentry error when the retrorockets failed to shut off when planned, their spacecraft was intentionally destroyed by remote self-destruct to prevent foreign powers from inspecting the capsule.

Mushka was one of the three dogs trained for Sputnik 2 and was used during ground tests. She did not fly on Sputnik 2 because she refused to eat properly.

Chernushka
Chernushka (Чернушка, "Blackie") made one orbit on board Korabl-Sputnik-4 (Sputnik 9) on 9 March 1961 with a cosmonaut dummy (whom Soviet officials nicknamed Ivan Ivanovich), mice and a guinea pig. The dummy was ejected out of the capsule during re-entry and made a soft landing using a parachute. Chernushka was recovered unharmed inside the capsule.

Zvyozdochka
Zvyozdochka (Zvezdochka, Звёздочка, "starlet"), who was named by Yuri Gagarin, made one orbit on board Korabl-Sputnik 5 on 25 March 1961 with a wooden cosmonaut dummy in the final practice flight before Gagarin's historic flight on 12 April. Again, the dummy was ejected out of the capsule while Zvezdochka remained inside. Both were recovered successfully.

Veterok and Ugolyok

Veterok (Ветерок, "light breeze") and Ugolyok (Уголёк, "ember") were launched on 22 February 1966 on board Cosmos 110, and spent 21 days in orbit before landing on 16 March. This spaceflight of record-breaking duration was not surpassed by humans until Soyuz 11 in June 1971 and still stands as the longest space flight by dogs. The two dogs showed signs of "cardiovascular deconditioning" with dehydration, weight loss, loss of muscle and coordination and took several weeks to fully recover, though they showed no long-term issues.

See also

 Animals in space
 Cosmo (comics)
 Félicette, first cat in space
 List of individual dogs
 Monkeys and non-human apes in space
 Museum of Jurassic Technology, which has an eternal flame dedicated to Laika and a portrait gallery of the USSR's space dogs
 Sputnik program
 Voskhod program

References

External links
A book chapter about biological experiments in geophysical rockets 
Space Today Online article about animals sent into space
 One Small Step: The Story of the Space Chimps, Official Documentary Site Documentary features rare footage of Laika and others.

Soviet dogs
Individual dogs
Sputnik
Crewed space program of the Soviet Union
Space dogs
Space dogs
Animal testing in the Soviet Union
Dogs in human culture